Carterica is a genus of longhorn beetles of the subfamily Lamiinae.

 Carterica buquetii Thomson, 1860
 Carterica cincticornis Bates, 1865
 Carterica mima Belon, 1903
 Carterica mucronata (Olivier, 1795)
 Carterica pygmaea Bates, 1881
 Carterica rubra Martins & Galileo, 2005
 Carterica soror Belon, 1896
 Carterica tricuspis Belon, 1903

References

Colobotheini